Jonas Swenholt (December 20, 1855 – March 8, 1923) was an American businessman and politician.

Jonas Swenholt born in the town of Oconomowoc, Waukesha County, Wisconsin. He was the son of John and Ingeborg Swenholt, both of whom were immigrants from Norway.  Swenholt moved with his parents to a farm in Scandinavia, Wisconsin in Waupaca County, Wisconsin in 1863. In 1880, Swenholt moved to Wittenberg, Wisconsin in Shawano County, Wisconsin. Swenholt was in the mercantile and lumber business. He served as postmaster of Wittenberg and different village and town offices. Swenholt served as register of deeds for Shawano County in 1896. Swenholt then served in the Wisconsin State Assembly in 1901 and 1905 as a Republican from Shawano County. In 1905, Swenholt moved to Madison, Wisconsin where he was the Wisconsin State Game Warden until 1907; he then worked as a mail clerk until his death. Swenholt died of a stroke at his house in Madison, Wisconsin. His son was Helmer Swenholt, a United States Army officer.

Notes

1855 births
1923 deaths
Politicians from Madison, Wisconsin
People from Wittenberg, Wisconsin
People from Oconomowoc, Wisconsin
People from Scandinavia, Wisconsin
Businesspeople from Madison, Wisconsin
Farmers from Wisconsin
Republican Party members of the Wisconsin State Assembly
American people of Norwegian descent